Moshe "Moussa" Harif (2 June 1933 – 16 January 1982) was an Israeli politician and kibbutz activist.

Biography
Born in Sosnowiec, Poland in 1933, to a Jewish family. Harif immigrated to Mandatory Palestine the following year. He attended high school in Jerusalem, and went on to study architecture and urban construction at the Technion.

In 1952, he joined kibbutz Tzora. He became a member of the Meuhedet movement, and served as its co-ordinator in the Jerusalem area from 1953 until 1955, and as its secretary from 1958 until 1959. Between 1968 and 1974 he worked in the planning department of Kibbutz HaMeuhad. He later became secretary of Ihud HaKvutzot VeHaKibbutzim and helped establish the United Kibbutz Movement, a merger of the two organisations.

In 1981, he was elected to the Knesset on the Alignment list. However, he died in a traffic collision in January the following year. His seat was taken by Edna Solodar. Neve Harif, a new kibbutz established in 1983, was named after him.

References

External links

1933 births
1982 deaths
People from Sosnowiec
Polish emigrants to Mandatory Palestine
Jews in Mandatory Palestine
Technion – Israel Institute of Technology alumni
Road incident deaths in Israel
Kibbutz Movements secretaries
Alignment (Israel) politicians
Members of the 10th Knesset (1981–1984)